Matthew Langford Perry (born August 19, 1969) is an American-Canadian actor, comedian and producer. He is best known for his role as Chandler Bing on the NBC television sitcom Friends (1994–2004).

As well as starring in the short-lived television series Studio 60 on the Sunset Strip, Perry has appeared in several films, including Fools Rush In, Almost Heroes, The Whole Nine Yards, 17 Again and The Ron Clark Story. In 2010, he worked in both voice-over and video games doing the voice of Benny in the video game Fallout: New Vegas.

Perry was co-creator, co-writer, executive producer, and star of the ABC sitcom Mr. Sunshine, which ran from February to April 2011. In August 2012, Perry began starring as Ryan King, a sportscaster, on the NBC sitcom Go On. The series was canceled on May 10, 2013. Perry co-developed and starred in the CBS sitcom The Odd Couple portraying Oscar Madison from 2015 to 2017.

Early life
Perry was born in Williamstown, Massachusetts, on August 19, 1969. His mother, Suzanne Marie Morrison née Langford (born 1948), is a Canadian journalist and served as press secretary to former Canadian Prime Minister Pierre Trudeau. His father, John Bennett Perry (born 1941), is an American actor and former model.

His parents divorced before his first birthday and his mother married Canadian-born broadcast journalist Keith Morrison. He was raised by his mother in Ottawa, Ontario (although he lived briefly in Toronto and Montreal, Quebec), and was educated at both the Rockcliffe Park Public School, alongside Canadian Prime Minister Justin Trudeau, and at Ashbury College. While growing up, he took a keen interest in tennis and became a top-ranked junior player.

Career 

When he was 15, Perry moved from Ottawa to Los Angeles to pursue acting and attended The Buckley School in Sherman Oaks, graduating in 1987. He pursued improvisational comedy at the LA Connection in Sherman Oaks while still in high school.

After graduating, he took the role of Chazz Russell in the TV series Second Chance. After 13 episodes, Second Chance became Boys Will Be Boys, with the plots refocused on the adventures of Chazz and his friends. After the show's single season, Perry stayed in Los Angeles and made his screen debut in the 1988 film A Night in the Life of Jimmy Reardon. In 1989, Perry had a three-episode arc on the series Growing Pains, in which he portrayed Carol Seaver's boyfriend Sandy who dies in the hospital after a drunk-driving accident.

In the midst of his many continuing guest roles on TV, Perry was cast as a regular on the 1990 CBS sitcom Sydney, playing the younger brother of Valerie Bertinelli's title character. In 1991, he made a guest appearance on Beverly Hills, 90210 as Roger Azarian. Perry landed his next TV starring role on the ABC sitcom Home Free, which aired only 11 episodes in the spring of 1993, followed by a sitcom pilot titled LAX 2194.

He attempted to secure an audition for the pilot Six of One, later to be known as Friends, by Marta Kauffman and David Crane, both of whom he had worked with on Dream On. However, due to previous commitments to the pilot LAX 2194, he was not initially considered for an audition. When he did eventually get a reading, he landed the part of Chandler Bing. He was the youngest of the main cast at age 24.

Friends was hugely successful, and Perry, along with his co-stars, became an international celebrity – something Perry had long hoped for. "There was steam coming out of my ears, I wanted to be famous so badly," he told The New York Times in 2002. "You want the attention, you want the bucks, and you want the best seat in the restaurant." Due to the immense popularity of the sitcom, Perry and the rest of the six-member main cast ensemble were each making $1 million per episode by 2002. The program earned him an Emmy nomination in 2002 for Outstanding Lead Actor in a Comedy Series, along with Matt LeBlanc, but the two lost to Ray Romano. Perry appeared in films such as Fools Rush In (alongside father John Bennett Perry and Salma Hayek), Almost Heroes, Three to Tango, The Whole Nine Yards (alongside Bruce Willis) and its sequel The Whole Ten Yards, and Serving Sara.

While known primarily for his comic roles, Perry has carved out a career in drama as well, particularly in his portrayal of Associate White House Counsel Joe Quincy in Aaron Sorkin's The West Wing. His three appearances in that series (twice in the fourth season and once in the fifth) earned him two Emmy nominations for Outstanding Guest Actor in a Drama Series in 2003 and 2004. Perry is referred to in the show prior to his guest appearance – Donna Moss seeks him out (off-screen) in the episode "20 Hours in LA". He also appeared as attorney Todd Merrick in two episodes near the end of Ally McBeal'''s five-season run, including a two-hour special intended to revive the legal comedy-drama.

After Friends wrapped up, Perry made his directorial debut in an episode of the 4th season of the American comedy-drama Scrubs, in which he also guest starred as "Murray Marks", an operator of a small airport's traffic control team. Murray is asked to donate a kidney to his father Gregory (played by Perry's real father).

He starred in the TNT movie The Ron Clark Story, also known as "The Triumph," which premiered August 13, 2006. Perry played small-town teacher Ron Clark, who relocates to the toughest class in the country. Perry received a Golden Globe nomination as well as an Emmy nomination for his performance.

From 2006 to 2007, Perry appeared in Aaron Sorkin's drama Studio 60 on the Sunset Strip. Perry played Matt Albie alongside Bradley Whitford's Danny Tripp, a writer-director duo brought in to help save a failing sketch show. Perry's character was considered to be substantially based on Sorkin's own personal experiences, particularly in television.

 
In 2006, he began filming Numb, a film based on a man suffering from depersonalization disorder. The film's tentative release date was pushed back several times, but was finally released to DVD on May 13, 2008. He also appeared in David Mamet's Sexual Perversity in Chicago in London. In 2009, he starred in the film 17 Again playing the older Mike O'Donnell. In 2008, Perry starred in the offbeat film Birds of America as Morrie Tanager, an uptight man who has to deal with his siblings. Showtime passed on a pilot called The End of Steve, a dark comedy starring, written and produced by Perry and Peter Tolan.

Perry's new comedy pilot, Mr. Sunshine, based on Perry's original idea for the show, was bought by ABC. Perry was set to portray a middle-aged man with an identity crisis. ABC canceled the series after nine episodes.

On March 1, 2012, it was reported that Perry had signed on to star on the NBC comedy pilot Go On, written and produced by former Friends writer/producer Scott Silveri. The project was picked up to series in May 2012. Perry portrayed Ryan King, a sportscaster who tries to move on after the death of his wife through the help of mandatory therapy sessions. The pilot aired on August 8, 2012, as a "sneak preview" after the 2012 Summer Olympics. The series premiered on September 11, 2012. On October 2, 2012, NBC ordered a full season of 22 episodes. NBC canceled Go On in May 2013, shortly after the conclusion of its first season.

In 2012, Perry guest-starred on the CBS drama The Good Wife, as attorney Mike Kresteva. In 2013, he reprised his role in the fourth season.

In 2014, Perry made his British TV debut in the one-off comedy program The Dog Thrower, which aired on May 1 as part of Sky Arts' Playhouse Presents. Perry portrayed "a charismatic man" who enchanted onlookers by throwing his dog in the air. From 2015 to 2017, Perry starred in, co-wrote, and served as executive producer of a revival of the sitcom The Odd Couple on CBS. Perry played Oscar Madison opposite Thomas Lennon as Felix Unger.

Perry played the lead role in a new production of his play The End of Longing, which premiered on February 11, 2016, at the Playhouse Theatre in London. The play transferred Off-Broadway to MCC Theater, which opened on June 5, 2017, with Jennifer Morrison.

In March 2017, Perry again reprised his role as attorney Mike Kresteva, in The Good Fight, a sequel show to the CBS drama The Good Wife.

Later in 2017, he starred as Ted Kennedy in the mini-series The Kennedys: After Camelot.

In 2018, Business Insider reported Perry's net worth to be around $80 million.

In October 2022, Perry published a memoir, Friends, Lovers, and the Big Terrible Thing. It became a bestseller on both Amazon and The New York Times charts.

Personal life

Perry holds both Canadian and American citizenship.

Perry dated Yasmine Bleeth in 1995. He also dated Julia Roberts from 1995 to 1996. He later dated Lizzy Caplan from 2006 to 2012.

Perry is a fan of the Fallout video game series. On a 2009 episode of The Ellen DeGeneres Show, he gave DeGeneres a copy of Fallout 3. This prompted game studio Obsidian Entertainment to cast him in the next installment of the series, Fallout: New Vegas.

In August 2018, it was reported that Perry had abdominal surgery to repair a gastrointestinal perforation. On September 15, 2018, he revealed in a tweet that he had spent three months recovering in the hospital, suggesting the surgery had taken place in June 2018.

He became engaged to Molly Hurwitz, a literary manager, in November 2020. In June 2021, Perry announced he had called off the engagement, telling People magazine, "Sometimes things just don't work out and this is one of them. I wish Molly the best."

He has described his politics as "left of center".

Drug and alcohol addiction
Perry became addicted to Vicodin after a jet-ski accident in 1997, and completed a 28-day rehab program later that year. He lost  in 2000 due to pancreatitis. He again entered rehab in February 2001 for addiction to Vicodin, methadone, amphetamines, and alcohol. He was filming Serving Sara in Texas when he suffered severe stomach pains, and flew to Los Angeles to check into Marina del Rey's Daniel Freeman Hospital. Perry's publicist, Lisa Kasteler, confirmed his rehab stay. He says he has spent around $9 million to get sober. He has revealed that due to his addiction issues, he does not remember three years of the time he was acting on Friends'', "somewhere between season three and six."

In 2011, as a celebrity spokesperson for the National Association of Drug Court Professionals, Perry went to Capitol Hill to lobby members of Congress in support of funding for drug courts. Perry received a Champion of Recovery award in May 2013 from the White House Office of National Drug Control Policy for opening Perry House, a sober living home situated in his former mansion in Malibu, California. Perry later sold the home and shuttered the rehab center in 2015. Perry has been completely sober since May 2021.

Filmography

Film

Television

Theatre

Video games

Specials

Awards and nominations

Book

References

External links 

 

1969 births
20th-century American male actors
21st-century American male actors
American male film actors
American male television actors
American male voice actors
American people of Canadian descent
Articles containing video clips
Canadian male film actors
Canadian male television actors
Canadian male voice actors
Canadian people of American descent
Living people
Male actors from Massachusetts
Male actors from Ottawa
People from Williamstown, Massachusetts
American expatriates in Canada
American emigrants to Canada